"Baby" Joe Mesi (born November 27, 1973) is an American retired boxer and Democratic Party politician from Tonawanda, New York. During his career, he defeated former world champion Vassily Jirov as well as former title challengers Bert Cooper, Monte Barrett, DaVarryl Williamson, and Jorge Luis González.

Early life 
Joe grew up in Tonawanda, New York, a suburb of Buffalo. He attended Sweet Home High School in Amherst, New York. He did not start his boxing career until he was about 19 years of age.

Boxing career 
He was a New York State Golden Gloves champion, and as an amateur boxer he defeated future two-time Heavyweight champion Hasim Rahman.  Mesi made it all the way to the finals in the 1996 Olympic Trials, but lost to eventual US heavyweight representative Lawrence Clay-Bey.  In Buffalo, for a brief period, Joe was once considered by some to be the city's "third professional franchise", with the Buffalo Sabres and Buffalo Bills being the other two.  Joe is still often seen at Bills and Sabres games and also supports many local charities.

Philanthropy 
In 2002, Mesi started a non-profit to raise awareness about organ donation and transplantation upon finding out his cousin was in need of a kidney transplant, and to help others in the Upstate New York area who needed such surgeries. His cousin, Ganelle Shanor, died in an accident before she was able to receive the operation. In January 2004, Mesi donated $7,500 to the Golisano Children's Hospital in Rochester, New York as a way of giving back to the Rochester community and to promote an upcoming fight at the Blue Cross Arena, with kidney transplant recipient Dillon Gonzalez and his family in attendance. The foundation was funded in part by admission fees to victory parties.

Injury and suspension 
Mesi's promising boxing career was set back greatly when an MRI indicated he had suffered at least one, perhaps two subdural hematomas 

The injuries came from a 2004 bout with former cruiserweight champion Vassiliy Jirov. In round 9, Mesi was knocked down from a right hook and in the tenth round he was knocked down two more times. Mesi managed to finish the fight on his feet and the bout was scored 94-93 for Mesi by all three judges.

In June 2005, Mesi, along with his attorneys and three doctors supporting his reinstatement, went before the Nevada State Athletic Commission to argue Mesi's hematomas had healed, and, he was, "in no more danger than any other boxer."  Mesi's appeal was denied by a 5-0 vote.  In response to Dr. Julian E. Bailes, chairman of the department of neurosurgery at the West Virginia University School of Medicine, opinion that: "Football players and other athletes who had even more severe head injuries than Mesi were allowed to continue their careers without further harmful effects." Dr. Tony Alamo, one of the board's commissioners, replied, "You play football, you don't play boxing."

The suspension effectively blacklisted him from boxing anywhere in the United States under the premise of the full faith and credit clause. He launched several ineffective lawsuits against parties they claimed had leaked news of his health, while also appealing to Nevada representatives that he should be allowed to box. The suspension was officially lifted when Mesi's Nevada boxing license expired at the end of 2005. However, he was unable to renew the license due to the concerns of Nevada boxing officials. In 2006, Mesi was again licensed by boxing commissions in Puerto Rico, Louisiana, Arkansas and Michigan, with a handful of other states to follow suit in 2007. Over that time, Mesi won all of his handful of fights, though effectively retired from boxing in 2007.

Joe Mesi had one of the longest active undefeated professional boxing records in the world for a heavyweight. Ranked #1 heavyweight contender by the WBC prior to his two-year layoff, Mesi was #16 in the December 2007 rankings. In 2018, Mesi was inducted into the Greater Buffalo Sports Hall of Fame and the New York State Boxing Hall of Fame.

Politics and life after boxing

On February 14, 2008, Mesi publicly expressed his interest to run for the New York State Senate.  He attempted to fill the 61st District seat vacated by Mary Lou Rath. He won the Democratic primary for the seat on September 9, 2008.
Mesi lost the general election to Republican Michael Ranzenhofer.

Most recently, Joe has taken a position with the Democratic Senate Majority heading up a local Buffalo liaison office.  
Mesi's name was circulated as a potential Democratic candidate to replace the retiring Jim Hayes in the New York State Assembly. The assembly seat was won by Raymond Walter.

Professionally, Mesi is a medical supply salesman with Abbott Medical. Mesi and his wife, Michele, have three children.

Professional boxing record 

|-  style="text-align:center; background:#e3e3e3;"
|  style="border-style:none none solid solid; "|Result
|  style="border-style:none none solid solid; "|Record
|  style="border-style:none none solid solid; "|Opponent
|  style="border-style:none none solid solid; "|Type
|  style="border-style:none none solid solid; "|Round
|  style="border-style:none none solid solid; "|Date
|  style="border-style:none none solid solid; "|Location
|  style="border-style:none none solid solid; "|Notes
|- align=center
|Win
|36–0
|align=left| Shannon Miller
|TKO
|1 
|
|align=left| 
|align=left|
|- align=center
|Win
|35–0
|align=left| Ron Johnson
|KO
|1 
|
|align=left| 
|align=left|
|- align=center
|Win
|34–0
|align=left| George Linberger
|TKO
|1 
|
|align=left| 
|align=left|
|- align=center
|Win
|33–0
|align=left| Jason Weiss
|UD
|4
|
|align=left| 
|align=left|
|- align=center
|Win
|32–0
|align=left| Dennis Matthews
|TKO
|2 
|
|align=left| 
|align=left|
|- align=center
|Win
|31–0
|align=left| Stephane Tessier
|UD
|6
|
|align=left| 
|align=left|
|- align=center
|Win
|30–0
|align=left| Ron Bellamy
|UD
|8
|
|align=left| 
|align=left|
|- align=center
|Win
|29–0
|align=left| Vassiliy Jirov
|UD
|10
|
|align=left| 
|align=left|
|- align=center
|Win
|28–0
|align=left| Monte Barrett
|MD
|10
|
|align=left| 
|align=left|
|- align=center
|Win
|27–0
|align=left| DaVarryl Williamson
|KO
|1 
|
|align=left| 
|align=left|
|- align=center
|Win
|26–0
|align=left| Robert Davis
|TKO
|1 
|
|align=left| 
|align=left|
|- align=center
|Win
|25–0
|align=left| Jason Curry
|KO
|2 
|
|align=left| 
|align=left|
|- align=center
|Win
|24–0
|align=left| David Izon
|KO
|9 
|
|align=left| 
|align=left|
|- align=center
|Win
|23–0
|align=left| Talmadge Griffis
|TKO
|5 
|
|align=left| 
|align=left|
|- align=center
|Win
|22–0
|align=left| Keith McKnight
|TKO
|6 
|
|align=left| 
|align=left|
|- align=center
|Win
|21–0
|align=left| Derrick Banks
|TKO
|1 
|
|align=left| 
|align=left|
|- align=center
|Win
|20–0
|align=left| Bert Cooper
|TKO
|7 
|
|align=left| 
|align=left|
|- align=center
|Win
|19–0
|align=left| Jorge Luis Gonzalez
|TKO
|4 
|
|align=left| 
|align=left|
|- align=center
|Win
|18–0
|align=left| Joey Guy
|TKO
|3 
|
|align=left| 
|align=left|
|- align=center
|Win
|17–0
|align=left| Matthew Green
|KO
|2 
|
|align=left| 
|align=left|
|- align=center
|Win
|16–0
|align=left| John Rainwater
|TKO
|3 
|
|align=left| 
|align=left|
|- align=center
|Win
|15–0
|align=left| Gary Winmon
|TKO
|1 
|
|align=left| 
|align=left|
|- align=center
|Win
|14–0
|align=left| Anthony Green
|TKO
|8 
|
|align=left| 
|align=left|
|- align=center
|Win
|13–0
|align=left| Rowyan Wallace
|KO
|2 
|
|align=left| 
|align=left|
|- align=center
|Win
|12–0
|align=left| Brian Sargent
|KO
|1 
|
|align=left| 
|align=left|
|- align=center
|Win
|11–0
|align=left| Dwayne Hall
|TKO
|1 
|
|align=left| 
|align=left|
|- align=center
|Win
|10–0
|align=left| Rodney McSwain
|TKO
|3 
|
|align=left| 
|align=left|
|- align=center
|Win
|9–0
|align=left| Jihad Abdulaziz
|UD
|4
|
|align=left| 
|align=left|
|- align=center
|Win
|8–0
|align=left| Martin Lopez
|KO
|3 
|
|align=left| 
|align=left|
|- align=center
|Win
|7–0
|align=left| Kevin Rosier
|TKO
|2 
|
|align=left| 
|align=left|
|- align=center
|Win
|6–0
|align=left| Art Bayliss
|KO
|1 
|
|align=left| 
|align=left|
|- align=center
|Win
|5–0
|align=left| Mike McGrady
|TKO
|2 
|
|align=left| 
|align=left|
|- align=center
|Win
|4–0
|align=left| Darryl Spratt
|KO
|1 
|
|align=left| 
|align=left|
|- align=center
|Win
|3–0
|align=left| Calvin Smith
|UD
|4
|
|align=left| 
|align=left|
|- align=center
|Win
|2–0
|align=left| Jim Brackney
|KO
|2 
|
|align=left| 
|align=left|
|- align=center
|Win
|1–0
|align=left| Dwane Cason Allen
|KO
|1 
|
|align=left| 
|align=left|
|- align=center

Accomplishments 

1993 – Empire State Games Gold Medalist
1993 – New York State Golden Gloves Champion – Super Heavyweight Division
1995 – New York State Golden Gloves Champion – Super Heavyweight Division
1996 – New York State Golden Gloves Champion – Super Heavyweight Division
1996 – United States Olympic Alternate – Super Heavyweight Division
1999 – New York State Heavyweight Champion
2003 – North American Boxing Federation Heavyweight Champion
2007 – World Boxing Council USNBC Heavyweight Champion

See also 

 Boxingscene.com article, 'Joe Mesi Return A Complex Proposition 
 Above article highlights a subsequent change in the rules applying to professional boxers in the State of Nevada which would allow Mesi to apply to fight in Nevada again (previously not so)

References

External links 
BabyJoeMesi.com – Official website of Joe Mesi (Currently Down)
 

  Vacates

Living people
1973 births
Heavyweight boxers
Italian male boxers
American people of Italian descent
SUNY Erie alumni
People from Tonawanda, New York
Sportspeople from New York (state)
New York (state) Democrats
American male boxers